Raytheon ELCAN Optical Technologies, also simply ELCAN (Ernest Leitz CANada), is a Canadian optics and electronics manufacturing company owned by American defense contractor Raytheon, currently based in Midland, Ontario.  ELCAN produces optical devices geared towards both civilian and military markets, and their products are sold through Armament Technology Inc. based in Halifax, Nova Scotia and associated channel of dealers.

Products
ELCAN is perhaps best known for making the prismatic C79 optical sight that is widely used on the Diemaco C7, FN MINIMI, FN MAG and CZ-805 BREN families of firearms. The 3.4×28 C79 is not designed as a sniper sight per se, but is rather intended to be mounted on a variety of service rifles used by regular infantrymen as well as designated marksmen.

The M145 Machine Gun Optic is a variant of the C79, which is different to the standard version in that ballistic compensation is in the reticle rather than in the mount. Reticle illumination is by a battery-powered LED with eleven brightness settings. It is used by the US military for its M249s and M240s.

ELCAN currently manufactures the "Specter" line of combat optics in a variety of configurations.  The Specter 4× Optical Sight, DR 1.5×/6×, DR 1x/4× and TR 1/3/9 are available with a BDC reticle for the 5.56×45mm NATO or the 7.62×51mm NATO.

See also
 Aimpoint AB
 Trijicon
 EOTech
 ITL MARS

External links 

Armament Technology Incorporated, distributor

References

Leica Camera
Raytheon Company
Firearm sights
Firearm manufacturers of Canada
Electronics companies of Canada